It's Showtime Indonesia is an Indonesian talent variety television show that premiered on March 25, 2019 on MNCTV. It is a franchise of the Philippine variety show of the same name, It's Showtime of ABS-CBN.

History
On March 19, 2019, a news report from Rappler announced the acquisition of an Indonesian franchise of It's Showtime in time for the program's tenth year celebration. The original program's business unit head Peter Edward Dizon shared a teaser video of the hosts on Facebook. It's Showtime became ABS-CBN's first non-narrative format franchise bought by a foreign company. With the franchise deal, familiar segments such as "Sine Mo ‘To", "Cash-Ya! Kaya!", "Ansabe", "Copy Cut" and "Bida Dance" were to be adapted for the Indonesian audience.

Creator and director Bobet Vidanes, hosts Jugs Jugueta and Teddy Corpuz, and ABS-CBN director Laurenti Dyogi were among few of the Filipino visitors to watch the pilot program on March 25, 2019.

Hosts

Main
 Raffi Ahmad 
 Luna Maya
 Chika Jessica
 Indra Herlambang 
 Leo Consul

Featuring
Mus Brother

Segments
Ayo Nari Adapted from Bida Kapamilya/Dance. Aspiring dance groups battle out in the It's Showtime stage and perform in front of a live audience and a panel of judges. The groups are scored from a scale of one to ten, with ten being the best. Groups with the highest overall scores will advance and be one step closer to the grand prize.
MasUK Pak Eko! Adapted from Cash-Ya! Kaya! Two teams challenge each other and compete to see which team can fit the most team members in a common household item.
Katamu Kataku Adapted from PUROKatatawanan
Cerpen CerbungAdapted from Sine Mo'To. Cerpen Cerbung is Showtime's sketch comedy segment, which parodies different topics, originally-written stories and personalities.
Bibir Gemas Adapted from Ansabe?!
Mini Me Adaped from Mini Me
Tarung Seru

References

External links

Indonesian-language television shows
Indonesian television series based on Philippine television series
Indonesian variety television shows
It's Showtime (TV program)
MNCTV original programming